Edward Fox (1788–1875) was a British landscape painter, active from 1813 to 1854.

References 

1788 births
1875 deaths
British landscape painters